Vitali Bubnovich (born 12 November 1974) is a Belarusian sports shooter. He competed at the 2004, 2008 and 2012 Summer Olympics.

References

External links
 

1974 births
Living people
Belarusian male sport shooters
Olympic shooters of Belarus
Shooters at the 2004 Summer Olympics
Shooters at the 2008 Summer Olympics
Shooters at the 2012 Summer Olympics
Shooters at the 2016 Summer Olympics
Sportspeople from Grodno
Shooters at the 2015 European Games
European Games gold medalists for Belarus
European Games bronze medalists for Belarus
European Games medalists in shooting
ISSF rifle shooters
Shooters at the 2019 European Games